Florence Eugenia Hezlet ( – 2 November 1945) was an Irish amateur golfer who played in the early 20th century.

Early life
Hezlet and her sisters, May Hezlet and Violet Hezlet, grew up in Ireland and became top golfers in their era.

Golf career

1907 British Ladies Amateur
In the 1907 British Ladies Amateur, held at Royal County Down Golf Club, she finished second, losing to her sister May by the score of 2 and 1.

1908 British Ladies Amateur
Florence would face her sister May once again in the finals of the 1908 British Ladies Amateur. She fell short again, losing by the score of 5 and 4. The tournament was quite the family affair. Florence had beaten her sister Violet in the semi-finals to set up the final match against May.

1909 British Ladies Amateur
Hezlet was the runner-up by the final score of 4 and 3 to Dorothy Campbell in the 1909 British Ladies Amateur at Royal Birkdale Golf Club.

Family
She married Robert Alexander Cramsie in Aghadowey in August 1910 and was later known by her married name. Her husband died in July 1942. In addition to her sisters, she had a brother, Charles Hezlet, who was runner-up in The Amateur Championship in 1914, played in the Walker Cup, and won several Irish amateur titles.

Death
Hezlet's date of birth is unknown. She died on 2 November 1945 at O'Harabrook, Ballymoney, County Antrim.

References

Irish female golfers
1880s births
1945 deaths